Interstate 235 (I-235) in Oklahoma is also known as the Centennial Expressway or the I-235 Central Expressway. It connects northbound to U.S. Highway 77 (US-77) to suburban Edmond and southbound at I-44 on to I-35 and the I-40 Crosstown Expressway near downtown Oklahoma City. US-77 is concurrent with I-235 for the entire route. South of its junction with I-40, I-235 becomes I-35.

Route description

I-235's route forms the eastern edge of Automobile Alley, the Deep Deuce residential neighborhood, and the Bricktown Entertainment District, all of which are in the eastern section of downtown Oklahoma City.

History
The I-235 designation was approved by the American Association of State Highway and Transportation Officials (AASHTO) on July 13, 1976. Only  were complete in 1978. It finally opened in 1989.

Beginning in the mid-1990s, a massive Capital Improvement Project program was started to widen and reconstruct US-77 between Edmond on the Broadway Extension and the North 36th Street exit on I-235. The project included widening to six or eight lanes, reconfiguring several interchanges, and installing a new BNSF railway bridge over I-235.

The interchange with I-44/SH-66 was reconstructed from a cloverleaf interchange to a four-level interchange that eliminated two cloverleaf ramps. The other two cloverleafs were widened and reconstructed and two new flyover ramps were added. The four-level interchange is the first of its kind in Oklahoma. The $105 million project lasted three years and was opened on March 3, 2022. An additional $16 million is being provided to reconstruct the I-44 to US-77 ramp and provide a direct connection to North Lincoln Boulevard. The project is expected to be started in 2023.

Exit list

References

External links

 I-235 at OKHighways.com

35-2 Oklahoma
35-2
2 Oklahoma
Transportation in Oklahoma City
Transportation in Oklahoma County, Oklahoma